Street Sounds Hip Hop Electro 11 is the eleventh compilation album in a series and was released 1986 on the StreetSounds label. The album was released on LP and cassette and contains ten electro music and old school hip hop tracks mixed by The Frog and Mad Dog Harris.

Track listing

References

External links
 Street Sounds Hip Hop Electro 11 at Discogs

1986 compilation albums
Hip hop compilation albums
Electro compilation albums